The Myanmar Development Resource Institute (abbreviated MDRI) is an independent think tank and economic and social policy research organization based in Yangon, Myanmar. MDRI consists of 3 specialized centers, namely the Centre for Economic and Social Development (CESD), Centre for Strategic and International Studies (CSIS) and the Centre for Legal Affairs. 

MRDI was initially proposed by Burmese economist U Myint in May 2011, in a paper entitled  “Reducing Poverty in Myanmar: The Way Forward,” to combat poverty. The Institute was then founded the following year, by U Myint and other advisors to President Thein Sein.

References

External links
Centre for Strategic and International Studies official website
Centre for Economic and Social Development official website

Economy of Myanmar
Think tanks based in Myanmar